Francisco Pontes (born 19 August 1905, date of death unknown) was a Brazilian equestrian. He competed in two events at the 1948 Summer Olympics.

References

1905 births
Year of death missing
Brazilian male equestrians
Olympic equestrians of Brazil
Equestrians at the 1948 Summer Olympics
Place of birth missing
20th-century Brazilian people